Ždala  is a village in Croatia. It is connected by the D210 highway to Gola. Its population in 2011 was 583.

Located on the Hungarian border almost all residents speak a dialect of the Hungarian language, although they declare themselves Croats.

Ždala has a kindergarten and an elementary school. The Roman Catholic parish church is dedicated to Holy Trinity.

References

Populated places in Koprivnica-Križevci County